Rubí Laura López Silva (born 16 January 1970) is a Mexican politician affiliated with the National Action Party. She served as Deputy of the LX Legislature of the Mexican Congress representing Guanajuato.

References

1970 births
Living people
Politicians from Guanajuato
Women members of the Chamber of Deputies (Mexico)
National Action Party (Mexico) politicians
21st-century Mexican politicians
21st-century Mexican women politicians
Deputies of the LX Legislature of Mexico
Members of the Chamber of Deputies (Mexico) for Guanajuato
People from Celaya